Thirty Capitol View Corridors place legal restrictions on construction in Austin, Texas, and five additional corridors have been proposed but not yet implemented. First established by the Texas Legislature in 1983, the corridors aim to preserve the visibility of the Texas State Capitol from various points around the city. While supported by cultural and historical preservation organizations, the Capitol View Corridors have also been criticized for limiting the potential for the development of new tall structures in downtown Austin.

List of corridors

A Capitol View Corridor is a quadrilateral that links a line segment somewhere in Greater Austin to the base of the capitol dome. No structure is permitted to be built that would intersect the viewing corridor and thus obstruct the protected view of the capitol. Twenty-one of the corridors protect pedestrian views, and eighteen protect vehicular views from roadways (some corridors protect both).

Existing corridors
, state law defines thirty Capitol View Corridors in Austin, while municipal code defines twenty-six protected corridors, twenty-one of which are identical to state-defined corridors and five of which differ slightly from five of the state corridors.

[a] The state and city definitions of this corridor disagree, with the state defining a longer section of the bridge as the protected viewpoint.

[b] The state and city definitions of this corridor disagree, with the state defining a point just downstream from the bridge as the protected viewpoint.

[c] The state and city definitions of this corridor disagree, with the city defining a longer section of the highway as the protected viewpoint.

[d] The state and city definitions of this corridor disagree, with the state defining a wider protected viewpoint, slightly farther north (closer to the lake).

[e] The state and city definitions of this corridor disagree, with the city defining a wider protected viewpoint.

[f] This corridor was partially obstructed by the addition of an upper seating deck to the east side of Darrell K Royal–Texas Memorial Stadium.

[g] Redevelopment of the airport has been exempted from compliance with this viewing corridor.

[h] This corridor is defined only under state law (not under city ordinance).

Additional proposed corridors
In February 2017, the Austin City Council considered a proposal to designate additional protected viewing corridors in east Austin. The proposal was provisionally approved by council on February 16, after an amendment removed one of the five proposed new corridors; that corridor was later restored to the proposal on March 2. , city staff are reviewing the proposed additional corridors for feasibility.

References

External links

 Map of the existing and proposed Capitol View Corridors on Google Maps

Austin, Texas-related lists
Cultural heritage conservation
Urban planning in the United States